The 2020 IMSA Prototype Challenge is the fifteenth season of the IMSA Lites series and its successors and the fourth season as the IMSA Prototype Challenge. The opening race of the season was on January 4 at the Daytona International Speedway and the season concludes on October 9 at Road Atlanta. The championship will be contested solely by LMP3 class prototypes.

Calendar

Race schedule
The 2020 schedule was released August 2, 2019.
A revised calendar was released May 15, 2020, due to changes made because of the COVID-19 pandemic.

Calendar changes
The round at Virginia International Raceway was replaced by a round at Road America.
Due to COVID-19 restrictions, the round at Mosport was replaced with a round at VIR.

Entry List
All cars use the Nissan VK50VE 5.0L V8 engine.

Race results

Notes

Championship standings

Points system

Driver's Championship

Team's Championship

Bronze Driver's Cup

References

External links 
 Series website 
 IMSA website

IMSA Prototype Challenge